General Necdet Özel (born 1950) is a Turkish Army general, who served as the 28th Chief of the General Staff of the Turkish Armed Forces. He also served as the commander of the Turkish Land Forces. General Necdet Özel is only the second in this position not to have NATO experience.

Early life and education
Özel was born in 1950 in Ankara. He graduated from the Turkish Military Academy in 1969 and the Infantry School in 1970. In 1975 he attended the London School of Economics for post graduates studies in International Diplomacy.

Military career
Özel served as a platoon leader and company commander in various units of the Turkish Land Forces Command (TLFC) until 1978. Following his graduation from Army War College in 1980 as a staff officer, he respectively served as Operations Plan Officer at Turkish Peace Forces HQ in Cyprus, Branch Chief and then as the Secretary General at the General Secretariat of Turkish Land Forces, Chief of Staff at the Turkish Military Academy, and as the Commander of the 17th Infantry Regiment.

Having promoted to Brigadier General in 1995, he served as the Commander of the 172nd Armored Brigade and as the Chief of Internal Security Operations Department, TLFC.

After his promotion to Major General in 1999, he assumed the command of the 39th Mechanized Infantry Division and of the Army War College.

High command
In 2003, he was promoted to Lieutenant General and served as the Commander of the 7th Corps and then as the Deputy Commander of Training and Doctrine Command, TLFC.

As a General, he served as the Commander of Aegean Army between 2007–2008, as the Commander of the 2nd Army between 2008–2010, and as the Commander of Gendarmerie between 2010–2011. After serving as the Commander of TLFC and as the Acting Commander of the Turkish Armed Forces between 29 July and 4 August 2011, he assumed the command of Turkish Armed Forces (TAF) on 4 August 2011. Between 4 August 2011 and 18 August 2015, he served as the 28th Chief of the Turkish General Staff, succeeded by Hulusi Akar.

Personal life
Özel is married to Kamuran Özel. They have one child.

References

External links
Necdet Ozel biography (Turkish Armed Forces)

Chiefs of the Turkish General Staff
1950 births
Living people
Turkish Army generals
General Commanders of the Gendarmerie of Turkey
Commanders of the Turkish Land Forces
Commanders of the Second Army of Turkey